Sebastiania weddelliana is a species of flowering plant in the family Euphorbiaceae. It was originally described as Stillingia weddelliana Baill. in 1865. It is native to Mato Grosso, Brazil.

References

Plants described in 1865
Flora of Brazil
weddelliana
Taxa named by Johannes Müller Argoviensis
Taxa named by Henri Ernest Baillon